The Hostosian National Independence Movement (MINH) is a leftist and pro-independence organization in Puerto Rico.  As of 2015, Julio Muriente is known to be the leader.

History
The MINH was formed on May 6, 2004, by a merger of the National Hostosian Congress (CNH) and the New Puerto Rican Independence Movement (NMIP). The two groups that formed the MINH were organizational descendants of the Puerto Rican Socialist Party (PSP). The organization's name and ideology are based on the tradition of Eugenio María de Hostos, a historical independence advocate. The official organ of the MINH is Red Betances and the newspaper "El Hostosiano".

The MINH was founded by the unification of two other independence groups: the "Congreso Nacional Hostosiano (CNH)" and the "Nuevo Movimiento Independentista Puertorriqueno (NMIP)". The MINH is not, nor strives to be, an electoral party. Instead, the MINH original goal was to operate in Civil Society as an autonomous entity engaged in community organizing, patriotic education campaigns, anti-colonialism, and defending/promoting the ideal of independence among Puerto Ricans.

It was an organizational observer of the Non-Aligned Movement.

Ideology
The MINH, as an organization, does not aspire to be an "electoral party", although its members are given the freedom to vote or not vote in Puerto Rican elections. 
Controversies exist within the independence movement because the MINH does not compel its members to vote for any particular party, but rather whichever candidate they, as individuals, believe is the best to administer the country. These controversies have greatly impacted the Puerto Rican independence movement. Along with the MINH, other independence organizations are the Puerto Rican Independence Party, the Nationalist Party of Puerto Rico, the Socialist Front, Communist Party of Puerto Rico, and the Socialist Workers Movement.

Program
The MINH has also been a strong catalyst in promoting a unicameral legislature in Puerto Rico, a Constituent Assembly on Status, and a greater role for Puerto Rico in the international arena, especially in the United Nations. Since 2004, the MINH has been organizing itself at the national, regional, and municipal levels with "base structures" and "specialized organizations". The MINH National Committee or Headquarters is located in San Juan. All other major Puerto Rican cities (Ponce, Mayagüez, Arecibo, Caguas, Toa Baja and Carolina) have Municipal Committees or "Base Structures" as do various other smaller towns throughout the island.

The MINH also operates various "Puerto Rico Missions", of which the most important is located in Havana, Cuba. Many more missions are planned to be established throughout Latin America, especially Mexico and Venezuela. Established groups that share the aims and goals of the MINH can join and affiliate themselves as "Specialized Organizations". The MINH has also established its own newspaper called "El Hostosiano" which is distributed throughout the island.

Organization
 Presidency- Three co-Presidents  are in charge of policy and administration. As of 2017 this includes Héctor Pesquera.
 Executive Directorate-(9) MINH political leadership
 National Directorate-(30+) MINH Delegates (Commissions/Organizations)
 National Assembly- meets to elect leadership and propose policy
 Commissions- various work groups dedicated to a function or area, such as Organization, Finance, Political Education, and International Affairs.

The organization also reportedly has a "radical youth wing".

Principles
MINH members (called "hostosianos") must be committed to the defense of "Social Justice Participatory Democracy and Making Puerto Rico a Free, Sovereign, and Independent Nation."

Political platform 
 Policy of Organizational Diversity 
 "National Unity"
 "Patriotic Unity"
 Active Participation in Presenting Proposals
 Organizational Inclusiveness, Participatory Democracy, and Respect for Divergent Positions      
 "Union of non-organized forces" 
 "Policy of Alliances"
 "Internationalist Policy" 
 Promoting the Interests of Mainland Puerto Ricans

Recent Events

In 2015 they praised (through their spokesperson Héctor Pesquera) Puerto Rican independence protests, saying "...it’s been a long time since an event for independence was so successful."

In 2016, MINH (via Wilma Reverón) denounced the collection of DNA samples from 3 independentist militants.

See also
Puerto Rican Independence Party (PIP)

References

External links
minhpuertorico.org
redbetances.com

Foro de São Paulo
National liberation movements
Political parties in Puerto Rico
Politics of Puerto Rico
Political organizations based in Puerto Rico
Puerto Rican independence movement
Secessionist organizations in the United States
State and local socialist parties in the United States